The eighth series of Warsaw Shore, a Polish television programme based in Warsaw, Poland was announced on 14 July 2017. The eighth season began airing on 3 September 2017. This was the first series not to include five former cast members Jakub Henke, Alan Kwieciński, Magda Pyznar, Klaudia Stec and Ewelina "Młoda" Bańkowska, and was the first to feature nine new cast members Jola Mróz, who had previously appeared during the first series of Ex on the Beach Poland as main cast member and second series as an ex-girlfriend of current cast member Piotr Polak, Anna "Andzia" Papierz, Bartek Barański, Ilona Borowska, Jacek Bystry, Kamila Widz, Marcin "Brzydal" Maruszak, Mariusz "Ryjek" Adam and Wiktoria Sypucińska. It also features the return of former original cast member Anna "Mała" Aleksandrzak who previously made exit during the previous series. The series also feature the show's 100th episode. Ahead of the series it was confirmed that the series would be filmed in Władysławowo.

Cast
 Anna "Andzia" Papierz (Episodes 1–10)
 Bartek Barański
 Damian Zduńczyk
 Ewelina Kubiak
 Ilona Borowska (Episodes 1–3)
 Jacek Bystry
 Jola Mróz
 Kamila Widz (Episodes 1–4)
 Anna "Mała" Aleksandrzak (Episodes 8–12)
 Marcin "Brzydal" Maruszak
 Mariusz "Ryjek" Adam (Episodes 1–2)
 Piotr Polak
 Wiktoria Sypucińska
 Wojciech Gola

Duration of cast

Notes 

 Key:  = "Cast member" is featured in this episode.
 Key:  = "Cast member" arrives in the house.
 Key:  = "Cast member" voluntarily leaves the house.
 Key:  = "Cast member" returns to the house.
 Key:  = "Cast member" leaves the series.
 Key:  = "Cast member" returns to the series.
 Key:  = "Cast member" is not a cast member in this episode.

Episodes

References 

2017 Polish television seasons
Series 8